16 Horsepower was an American band based in Denver, Colorado, United States. Their music often invoked religious imagery dealing with conflict, redemption, punishment, and guilt through David Eugene Edwards's lyrics and the heavy use of traditional bluegrass, gospel, and Appalachian instrumentation cross-bred with rock. For the bulk of its career, the band consisted of Edwards, Jean-Yves Tola, and Pascal Humbert, the latter two formerly of the French band Passion Fodder. After releasing four studio albums and touring extensively, the group broke up in 2005, citing "mostly political and spiritual" differences.  The members remain active in the groups Wovenhand and Lilium.

Band history

David Eugene Edwards and Pascal Humbert formed 16 Horsepower in 1992 in Los Angeles, California, where they had met building movie sets for Roger Corman's Hollywood Studios. Friend, co-worker and trained jazz drummer Jean-Yves Tola joined shortly after. The trio performed once as Horsepower before they parted ways with Humbert as Edwards and Tola relocated to Denver, Colorado.

In Edwards's hometown of Denver, the band once again became a trio with the addition of Keven Soll, a luthier and accomplished double bass player.  Frustrated by misconceptions about the name Horsepower being related to heroin and inspired by a traditional American folk song about sixteen horses pulling the coffin of a beloved to the graveyard, the name was changed to 16 Horsepower. The band spent the following years rehearsing and gaining a reputation for their intense live performances while touring extensively across North America and eventually they released a seven-inch single, "Shametown", in 1994 on Ricochet Records. By this time they had gained the attention of A&M Records, and recording of Sackcloth 'n' Ashes began in 1995. For various reasons A&M decided to postpone the release of the album, and so the band returned to the studio and recorded their eponymous debut EP which was released the same year.

The debut full-length studio album Sackcloth 'n' Ashes was eventually released in 1996, garnering praise from the international music press. Pascal Humbert had relocated to Denver and joined the band as a second guitarist, although his primary instrument is the bass. Following differences about the musical direction, Soll was asked to leave and was replaced by Rob Redick, later known as the bassist for Candlebox. Redick did not last long because of what the band has referred to as "kind of a mutual unhappiness", and Humbert took over the bass duties. Jeffrey-Paul Norlander joined on second guitar shortly before recording began on the second album, Low Estate, with John Parish as producer. Edwards and Norlander had previously been in several bands together, most notably The Denver Gentlemen.

Norlander departed in 1998 and was replaced by Steve Taylor, the band's guitar technician, who had already been performing on a handful of songs on the bands European tour in 1996.

Spending two years touring and writing new material, 16 Horsepower's third full-length album Secret South was not recorded and released until 2000. The album marked a distinct change in sound and tone from earlier releases as the up-tempo rock influences had all but vanished completely and left room for a more melodic folk-inspired sound. The band toured in Europe in 2000 with the new album, and rumours of a break-up began to circulate shortly after. This rumour was further fueled by the fact that the band members had begun to focus on solo and side-projects. Humbert had released his solo-debut with his project Lilium the previous year and Edwards had begun recording and performing live with his new project Woven Hand.

16 Horsepower, short of Steve Taylor, returned in 2002 with Folklore. As hinted by the title, this fourth studio album took the band further into traditional folk territory and featured only four original 16 Horsepower compositions. While the band went on several tours in support of the album, their creative output was focused on Woven Hand and Lilium, Tola having also joined the latter. Olden, a compilation of previously unreleased versions of early material was released in 2003.  This release was supported by a tour in early 2004, including their first US dates in three years, featuring a set split between early material and Folklore-era songs. In April 2005 the band announced their official break-up, as a result of personal, political and spiritual differences as well as finding the constant touring incompatible with their daily lives.

Alternative Tentacles, a San Francisco-based record label run by former Dead Kennedys frontman Jello Biafra absorbed American distribution of the band's latter records shortly before their breakup.  Since the band's demise, the label has released two DVD-format retrospectives, and in 2008 released a two-CD set Live March 2001.  Humbert joined Woven Hand in 2007.

Musical style
It has always been difficult to describe the band's music in simple terms as it borrowed just as heavily from folk music, country, bluegrass, and traditional as it did from rock music. 16 Horsepower has been classified as alternative country, blues, country rock, folk, gothic country, hillbilly, folk rock, gospel, neo-gothic and progressive country, and as being representatives of the "Denver Sound".

Edwards' grandfather was a Nazarene preacher and young Edwards often went along as his elder preached the gospel to various peoples. This experience colored his approach to songwriting as well as the instrumentation employed to develop the band's unique sound. On several tracks over the course of the band's career, Edwards evoked decisive Christian imagery, particularly that of the redemptive capacity of Jesus Christ.

16 Horsepower, especially in their early days, saw themselves first and foremost as a rock band. David Eugene Edwards, however, had an interest in all things from past times, including musical instruments. One instrument that was paramount during the nascent days of 16 Horsepower was the Chemnitzer concertina. It was erroneously credited as a bandoneon (a closely related instrument) on Sackcloth 'n' Ashes. The antique instrument used on the early tours and recordings was falling apart and quite cumbersome to tour with; some time before the sessions for Low Estate, it was replaced with the more modern American-made Patek brand instrument.

Acknowledged influences on the band included Joy Division, the Gun Club, Nick Cave and the Birthday Party. 16 Horsepower would eventually share the same management as Nick Cave and the Bad Seeds and tour with them. They also collaborated with Bertrand Cantat from French band Noir Désir on a cover of The Gun Club's "Fire Spirit" for the 1998 EP The Partisan and on "The Partisan" itself.

Legacy
16 Horsepower are among the Denver-based bands credited for laying the foundation for what today has become known as "Gothic Americana". American metal band DevilDriver paid homage to 16 Horsepower with a cover of "Black Soul Choir" on their 2011 release, Beast. A post-rock interpretation of "Black Soul Choir" sung by Brandy Bones became a live staple of Canadian band Big John Bates during their 2012 Battered Bones tour.

Their 2000 cover of "Wayfaring Stranger" was featured at the end of Bart Layton's 2012 documentary The Imposter, as well as in the opening scene of the 2021 film Titane.

Band members

Former members
 David Eugene Edwards – vocals, guitar, banjo, Chemnitzer concertina, hurdy-gurdy, lap steel, bandoneon, piano (1992–2005)
 Jean-Yves Tola – drums, percussion, piano, vocals (1992–2005)
 Pascal Humbert – bass, upright bass, guitar, vocals (1992, 1996–2005)
 Keven Soll – upright bass, flat top bass, cello, vocals (1993–1996)
 Rob Redick – bass (1996–1997)
 Jeffrey-Paul Norlander – fiddle, guitar, cello, organ, vocals (1997–1998)
 Steve Taylor – guitar, keyboards, vocals (1998–2001)

Live guests
 Bob Ferbrache – lap steel guitar (1996)
 Elin Palmer – violin (2001)
 Daniel McMahon – organ (2002)
 John Rumly – guitar, bass, banjo (2002)

Discography

Albums
 16 Horsepower EP (CD - 1995)
 Sackcloth 'n' Ashes (CD - 1996)
 Low Estate (CD - 1997)
 Secret South (CD/vinyl - 2000)
 Hoarse (CD - 2000)
 Folklore (CD/vinyl - 2002)
 Olden (CD/vinyl - 2003)
 Live March 2001 (CD - 2008)
 Yours Truly (compilation 2CD/vinyl - 2011)

Compilation albums
 Radio Asylum Vol. 1

Singles
 "Shametown" (vinyl 7" - 1994)
 "Black Soul Choir" (CD - 1996)
 "Haw" (vinyl - 1996)
 "For Heaven's Sake" (CD - 1997)
 "Coal Black Horses" (CD - 1997)
 "The Partisan" (CD - 1998)
 "Clogger" (CD - 2000)
 "Splinters" (CD - 2001)

Video
 "Black Soul Choir" and "Haw" (1995)
 16HP DVD (2005)
 Live DVD (2006)

References

External links
16 Horsepower site (archived December 2007, Web.archive.org)

Alternative Tentacles artists
American alternative country groups
American country rock groups
Gothic country groups
Musical groups from Denver
Musical groups established in 1992
Musical groups disestablished in 2005
Glitterhouse Records artists